Gayton le Marsh is a village and civil parish in the East Lindsey district of Lincolnshire, England It is situated  south-east from the town of Louth and about  north from Alford. The population of the civil parish was 155 at the 2011 census.

Gayton le Marsh parish church was dedicated to Saint George. It had a western tower, was rebuilt in 1847, and was demolished in 1971.

A red-brick drainage pumping station was built here about 1850, which is now a Grade II listed building.

Gayton le Marsh CE School was built as a National School in 1837, and closed in 1924.

References

External links

Civil parishes in Lincolnshire
Villages in Lincolnshire
East Lindsey District